Andrew Gerald McBride Jr. (June 26, 1960 – April 29, 2022) was an American attorney based in Washington, D.C., and a former U.S. Supreme Court law clerk, U.S. Department of Justice official, and Assistant United States Attorney.

Early life and education
Andrew Gerald McBride Jr. was born on June 26, 1960, to Andrew Gerald and Patricia McBride in Paterson, New Jersey. He grew up in Glen Rock. He played football for Bergen Catholic High School in Oradell, New Jersey, and was a National Merit Scholarship Program Semi-Finalist.

In 1982, he earned his bachelor's degree magna cum laude from the College of the Holy Cross, where he was a member of Phi Beta Kappa. In 1987, he earned his Juris Doctor with distinction from Stanford Law School, where he was a member of the Order of the Coif.

He served as a law clerk to the Honorable Robert Bork on the United States Court of Appeals for the District of Columbia Circuit from 1987 to 1988, a period that overlapped with Bork's nomination to the Supreme Court. He helped edit Bork's 1990 book The Tempting of America.

From 1988 to 1989, McBride clerked for Associate Justice Sandra Day O'Connor on the U.S. Supreme Court. In the 1989 book Closed Chambers, author Edward Lazarus, who clerked for Justice Harry Blackmun during the 1988–89 term, named McBride as the leader of a "conservative cabal" of Supreme Court law clerks  that included Miguel Estrada, Paul Cappuccio, Thomas Hungar and R. Hewitt Pate. He arranged for Wiley Rein to host a 2013 book-tour event for Justice O'Connor for her book Out of Order: Stories from the History of the Supreme Court.

Department of Justice
From 1989 to 1992, McBride served in the United States Department of Justice under Attorneys General Dick Thornburgh and William P. Barr.  He worked on national security issues, including the use of military tribunals to try terrorists and the capture and trial of Manuel Noriega.  He also argued the case of United States v. Alvarez-Machain, involving the kidnapping of Dr. Machain from Mexico to stand trial in the United States for the murder of Enrique Camarena (DEA agent). From 1992 to 1999, he served as Assistant U.S. Attorney in the United States District Court for the Eastern District of Virginia, the so-called "Rocket Docket".

McBride was one of the lead prosecutors on the 1996 case of the Sugar Bottom Murders, a triple-murder carried out by a Jamaican drug gang known as the Poison Clan.  The trial resulted in murder convictions for all four defendants involved, though the jury refused to give the death penalty.  He was also lead prosecutor in the Otto von Bressensdorf affair (1998), in which a German man claiming to be a baron and financier fleeced investors out of millions of dollars. Von Bressendsdorf and his wife were convicted of 27 counts each of mail fraud, conspiracy, and money laundering, and sentenced to more than 11 years in prison.

Professional life
In 2019, McBride became a partner at McGuireWoods in its Government Investigations & White Collar Department. He was previously at Perkins Coie and Wiley Rein. At Wiley, he served as chairman of its Communications group. In RIAA v. Verizon (2003), McBride won an early privacy ruling in the United States Court of Appeals for the District of Columbia Circuit rejecting attempts by the Recording Industry Association of America to use Digital Millennium Copyright Act; In CTIA – The Wireless Association v. San Francisco (2012), won a decision from the United States Court of Appeals for the Ninth Circuit invalidating a city ordinance requiring radio-frequency emissions warnings for mobile phones. McBride, representing a group of law professors as amici curiae, proposed the statutory theory under the Federal Arbitration Act that was adopted by Justice Clarence Thomas in AT&T Mobility v. Concepcion (2011).

McBride represented Washington Redskins owner Daniel Snyder’s broadcast company, Red Zebra Broadcasting, which owns radio station WWXX-FM (ESPN FM 94) in renewing its license when faced with a petition alleging use of team's name is a "derogatory racist word," its repeated use on the air "is akin to broadcasting obscenity" in violation of federal law.  The FCC dismissed claims that Red Zebra lacks the character qualifications required to hold an FCC license.

Personal life
McBride married Elizabeth Alden in 1998. They had two daughters, Caroline and Allison who are both students. McBride was an avid biker and completed many cross-country biking trips in his spare time. He was fluent in French and was proficient in conversational Arabic.

See also 
List of law clerks of the Supreme Court of the United States (Seat 8)

References 

1960 births
2022 deaths
American lawyers
College of the Holy Cross alumni
Law clerks of the Supreme Court of the United States
People from Paterson, New Jersey
Stanford Law School alumni
Lawyers from Washington, D.C.
McGuireWoods people